Meredith Russo (born circa 1986/1987) is an American young adult author from Chattanooga, Tennessee.

Personal life 
Russo is a transgender woman who transitioned in late 2013. Her debut young adult novel If I Was Your Girl is the first widely distributed young adult book about transgender teens written by a transgender woman. It was inspired by Russo's life events. She wanted to write a book about a transgender character with a happy ending. In addition to her literary efforts, she campaigns heavily for HIV awareness and de-stigmatization.

Career 
Russo's debut young adult novel, If I Was Your Girl, published in 2016 by Flatiron Books. If I Was Your Girl is about a trans girl going to a new school and falling in love with a boy. If I Was Your Girl won the Stonewall Book Award for the Young Adult category in 2017 and the Walter Dean Myers Award for Outstanding Children's Literature in 2017. It also received a starred review from Kirkus Reviews, Publishers Weekly, and Booklist.

Her next young adult novel, Birthday, was published by Flatiron Books in 2019 and is a follow-up to her award-winning debut If I Was Your Girl, following two teenagers whose lives intersect starting from both their 13th birthdays.

Russo also contributed several short stories and essays to anthologies published by Houghton Mifflin Harcourt, Vintage, and Algonquin.

The different characters of her stories are based on people she met during her life or from her own personal experience.

In an interview, she said that she has been inspired by a lot of comics, manga as well as fictions

Bibliography

Novels

Young adult 

 If I Was Your Girl (Flatiron, 2016)
 Birthday (Flatiron, 2019)

Short stories and essays 

 in Radical Hope: Letters of Love and Dissent in Dangerous Times, edited by Carolina Ee Robertis (Vintage, 2017)
 in (Don't) Call me Crazy, edited by Kelly Jensen (Algonquin Books, 2018)
 in Meet Cute: Some People Are Destined to Meet, edited by Jennifer L. Armentrout (HMH, 2018)
Horror Stories from Meredith Russo's website
Meltdown from Meredith Russo's website

Awards

Won

2017 

 Stonewall Book Award in the Children's and Young Adult Literature category for If I Was Your Girl (Flatiron, 2016)
 Walter Dean Myers Award for Outstanding Children's Literature for If I Was Your Girl (Flatiron, 2016)

Nominations

2017 
 Milwaukee County Teen Book Award Nominee for If I Was Your Girl (Flatiron, 2016)
Lambda Literary Award for Transgender Fiction for If I Was Your Girl (Flatiron, 2016)

References

Transgender women
LGBT people from Tennessee
Living people
1980s births
Novelists from Tennessee
People from Chattanooga, Tennessee
American LGBT novelists
Stonewall Book Award winners
Transgender novelists
American transgender writers